Haakon may refer to:

Given names
 Haakon (given name)
 Håkon, modern Norwegian spelling of the name
 Håkan, Swedish spelling of the name
 Hakon, Danish spelling of the name

People

Norwegian royalty
 Haakon I of Norway (c. 920–961), the Good
 Haakon Sigurdsson, Earl of Hlaðir (c. 937–995), king of Norway in all but name
 Haakon Ericsson (died c. 1029–1030), Earl of Lade and governor of Norway from 1012 to 1015 as a vassal under Danish king Knut the Great
 Haakon Magnusson of Norway (1068–94)
 Haakon II of Norway (died 1162), Haakon Herdebrei
 Haakon III of Norway (1170s–1204), Haakon Sverreson
 Haakon IV of Norway  (1204–1263),  the Old
 Haakon V of Norway (1270–1319), Haakon V Magnusson
 Haakon VI of Norway (c. 1340–1380), as Håkan also King of Sweden
 Haakon VII of Norway (1872–1957)
 Haakon, Crown Prince of Norway (born 1973), crown prince of Norway

Other people
 Håkan the Red (fl. late 11th century), Swedish ruler
 Haakon Paulsson (c.1105 – 1123), Earl of Orkney
 Haakon the Crazy (died 1214), Norwegian noble
 Haakon Chevalier (1901 – 1985), American author, translator, and professor of French literature
 Håkon Wium Lie, a web technologist (born in 1965)

Places
 Haakon County, South Dakota, United States

Ships
 HNoMS King Haakon VII, a Royal Norwegian Navy escort ship in commission from 1942 to 1951
 HNoMS Haakon VII (A537), a Royal Norwegian Navy training ship in commission from 1958 to 1974

See also

 Haakonian Order, fictional extraterrestrial race in Star Trek
 
 Haakon VII (disambiguation)